The Visayan fantail (Rhipidura albiventris) is a fantail endemic to the Philippines on islands of Negros, Panay, Guimaras, Masbate and Ticao. Until recently, it was considered conspecific with the blue-headed fantail and Tablas fantail.

Description 
EBird describes the bird as "A medium-sized, long-tailed bird of forest . Dull blue on the head, chest, back, and shoulder, with some paler blue streaking on the chest and crown. Has a white belly and a rufous lower back, outer tail feathers, and wing, with dark central tail feathers and a dark edge to the wing. Often cocks and fans tail while foraging. Similar to Black-naped Monarch, but has rufous rump and tail. Voice is a single, nasal “jep” note given at intervals or sped up into a rapid series."

It is differentiated from the blue-headed fantail and Tablas fantail with its white belly and generally lighter coloration. 

It is often seen with mixed species flocks.

Habitat and Conservation Status 
Its habitat is in tropical moist primary and secondary forest and forest edge both in the lowlands to montane areas up to 1,800 meters above sea level.

IUCN has assessed this bird as a least-concern species. However, it is said to be already extinct on Guimaras and possibly extinct on Masbate and Ticao Island owing to massive deforestation on those islands.

References

Sánchez-González, L.A., and R.G. Moyle. 2011. Molecular systematic and species limits in the Philippine fantails (Aves: Rhipidura). Molecular Phylogenetics and Evolution 61: 290–299.

External links
Image at ADW

Visayan fantail
Endemic birds of the Philippines
Fauna of the Visayas
Visayan fantail
Visayan fantail